Albert Frank "Al" Gould (January 20, 1893 – August 8, 1982), also known as "Pudgy", was an American Major League Baseball player who pitched two seasons for the Cleveland Indians of the American League.

Major League career
Gould made his major league debut on July 11, 1916, for the Cleveland Indians. He pitched a shutout on August 2,  against the Philadelphia Athletics. He finished the season with a 5-6 record and a 2.53 earned run average (ERA) in 30 games. The following season, he spent the year with the Indians and played in 27 games, going 4-4 with a 3.64 ERA. He returned to the minor leagues after that season.

Minor League career
Gould enjoyed a long career in the minors, mainly playing in the Pacific Coast League (PCL). A very good fielder in both the minors and the majors, he twice led the PCL at his position in fielding percentage. Most of his minor league success game with the Salt Lake City Bees. With them, he had 71 wins in five seasons between 1919 and 1923.

Post-career
Gould died on August 8, 1982, at the age of 89 in San Jose, California, and was cremated and interred at Los Gatos Memorial Park in San Jose.

References

External links

1893 births
1982 deaths
Major League Baseball pitchers
Baseball players from Iowa
Cleveland Indians players
Muscatine Wallopers players
Muscatine Buttonmakers players
Davenport Blue Sox players
Toronto Maple Leafs (International League) players
Salt Lake City Bees players
Oakland Oaks (baseball) players
Sacramento Senators players
San Francisco Seals (baseball) players
Hollywood Stars players
Portland Beavers players
People from Muscatine, Iowa